Troels Ravn (born 2 August 1961 in Bryrup) is a Danish politician, who is a member of the Folketing for the Social Democrats political party. He entered parliament on 12 January 2016 when Bjarne Corydon resigned his seat. He had previously been a member of parliament from 2005 to 2007 and again from 2011 to 2015.

Political career
Ravn was a member of the municipal council of Vejen Municipality from 2002 to 2005 and again from 2010 to 2011. From 29 October 2008 to 20 November 2008 he was a substitute member of the Folketing, substituting for Lise von Seelen. In the 2005 Danish general election he was elected into parliament, but was not reelected in 2007. In 2011 he was elected again. In 2015 he was not reelected, but became a substitute member for his party in his constituency. When Bjarne Corydon resigned his seat on 12 January 2016, Ravn took over the seat. Ravn was reelected in 2019.

References

External links 
 Biography on the website of the Danish Parliament (Folketinget)

1961 births
Living people
People from Silkeborg Municipality
Social Democrats (Denmark) politicians
Members of the Folketing 2005–2007
Members of the Folketing 2011–2015
Members of the Folketing 2015–2019
Members of the Folketing 2019–2022